Welton Felipe may refer to:
 Welton Felipe (footballer, born 1986)
 Welton Felipe (footballer, born 1997)